Krusty is a Cantopop music group formed by Jan Cheung and Chucky. The group was created by the Hong Kong music production company Silly Thing in 2005, and is characterised by its outstanding dancing skill, bright and upbeat melodies and cute appearance. Probably because of that, the group received a considerable number of commercial and advertising contracts in its first year. Clients in 2005 alone included Panasonic, Esprit, Coca-Cola, Levi's, Sunday, Beauty Square, California Red Karaoke, Puma and 2% ODF.

Krusty's first album, Hello Krusty, was released in 2005 and the song "Krusty’s Wardrobe" soon became a #1 hit on the Hong Kong Music Bus for two weeks.

Jan Cheung is the older sister of Steven Cheung, the leader of another Cantopop music group Sun Boy'z, and Ryan Cheung. They were born of Chinese/Dutch parentage.

Hong Kong girl groups
Cantopop musical groups
Musical groups established in 2005
Musical groups disestablished in 2008
Pop music duos
Female musical duos